Arthroleptis affinis is a species of frog in the family Arthroleptidae.
It is endemic to Tanzania.
Its natural habitats are subtropical or tropical moist lowland forests, subtropical or tropical moist montane forests, subtropical or tropical high-altitude grassland, swamps, arable land, pastureland, plantations, rural gardens, heavily degraded former forest, and introduced vegetation.

References

affinis
Amphibians described in 1939
Frogs of Africa
Taxonomy articles created by Polbot